Kerstin Jönßon (born 3 July 1964) is a German handball player who played for the West German national team and later for Austria. She was born in Glückstadt. She represented West Germany at the 1984 Summer Olympics in Los Angeles, where the West German team placed fourth. 

She represented Austria at the 1992 Summer Olympics in Barcelona.

References

1964 births
Living people
Sportspeople from Schleswig-Holstein
German female handball players
Olympic handball players of West Germany
Handball players at the 1984 Summer Olympics
Austrian female handball players
Olympic handball players of Austria
Handball players at the 1992 Summer Olympics